Agrotis admirationis is a moth of the family Noctuidae. It is endemic to New Zealand. It was first described by Achille Guenée in 1868 from specimens collected by Richard William Fereday. Specimens of this species have been taken in Christchurch. Its favoured host plants are herbs found in open areas.

References

Agrotis
Moths of New Zealand
Endemic fauna of New Zealand
Moths described in 1868
Taxa named by Achille Guenée
Endemic moths of New Zealand